The olive small-eyed snake (Hydrablabes periops) is a species of natricine snake found in Malaysia,
Indonesia, and Brunei.

References

Hydrablabes
Reptiles of Malaysia
Reptiles of Indonesia
Reptiles of Brunei
Reptiles described in 1872
Taxa named by Albert Günther
Reptiles of Borneo